Ngamalacinus timmulvaneyi lived during the early Miocene and has been found in Riversleigh.

The species was a carnivorous, quadrupedal marsupial in Australia. In appearance it resembled a dog with a long snout. Its molar teeth were specialized for carnivory, the cups and crest were reduced or elongated to give the molars a cutting blade.

Taxonomy 
The description of a new species and genus was published in 1997, emerging from examination undertaken by Jeanette Muirhead on specimens obtained at the Riversleigh World Heritage Area.
The genus combines the Wanyi ngamala, "died out", and the Ancient Greek kynos, alluding to a "dog" for the resemblance to the canid family.
The specific epithet names Tim Mulvaney, who was gifted the honour by his aunt, Margaret Beavis, for long time support toward research of Riversleigh fauna.

Description 
A species assigned to a monotypic genus of Thylacinidae, most closely resembling the genus Wabulacinus yet separable from a Wabulacinus–Thylacinus clade as a sister group of those thylacinids. The size and form of the animal is estimated to have been that of a smaller dog breed and inhabited the Riversleigh area with similar sized thylacinids. The discovered existence of multiple phylogenies in early Miocene Riversleigh fauna, each presumably specialised to an ecological niche, strongly supported a revised conception of the family's evolutionary history from a monophyletic group of taxa with a narrow range of adaptations and trophic levels.

Specimens referred to Ngamalacinus timmulvaneyi have been obtained at the Inabeyence and Camel Sputum sites at Riversleigh.

References

External links

Natural Worlds

Prehistoric thylacines
Prehistoric mammals of Australia
Miocene marsupials
Riversleigh fauna
Prehistoric marsupial genera